The 2019 Jacksonville mayoral election was held on March 19, 2019, to elect the mayor of Jacksonville. Incumbent mayor Lenny Curry won a majority of votes to win a second term in office.

Candidates

Republican Party

Declared
Lenny Curry, incumbent mayor
Anna Brosche, member of Jacksonville City Council
Jimmy Hill, small business owner and president of International Association of Fire Fighters Local 2622

Democratic Party
While Democratic candidates did declare their candidacy, no Democratic candidates qualified for the mayoral election in 2019.

Declared
Doreszell Cohen, founder of Citizens for Criminal Justice Reform
Yolanda Thornton, small business owner

Declined
Alvin Brown, former mayor of Jacksonville
Garrett Dennis, member of Jacksonville City Council

Independents

Declared
Omega Allen
Connell Crooms, nonprofit director
Vishaun Grissett, independent consultant

Results

References

2019
Jacksonville
Jacksonville